Chicopee Comprehensive High School (CCHS) is a public high school educating children in grades 9 to 12, which is located in Chicopee, Massachusetts, United States.  Its official school colors are blue and gold.  The school's mascot is the "colt".

Sports 

In December 2 of 2006, CCHS football team won the Div.2A Super Bowl title. In the Spring of 2009, the CCHS outdoor Track and Field team took third place at the Western Massachusetts level, and sent 5 athletes to the All-State competition.
In 2010 Chicopee Comp's Boys volleyball team won the state championship.

Baseball coach Dan Dulchinos retired at the end of the 2012 season after a tenure of 50 years; he began when CCHS opened in 1962.  His teams had over 600 wins, including four Western Massachusetts Championships.  He is an inaugural member of the Western Massachusetts Baseball Hall of Fame.

Notable alumni 
Evelyn C. Leeper, twelve-time Hugo Award nominee for Best Fan Writer.
Victoria Principal, actress, did not graduate from CCHS
Rick Purcell, candidate for Lieutenant Governor, 2010
Sean D. Sears, peaked in high school, bronze medal winner of "International Rock Paper Scissors" competition held in China at the same time as the 2008 Summer Olympics.

References 

Schools in Chicopee, Massachusetts
Educational institutions in the United States with year of establishment missing
Public high schools in Massachusetts